Hildegard Westerkamp (born April 8, 1946, in Osnabrück, Germany) is a Canadian composer, radio artist, teacher and sound ecologist of German origin. She studied flute and piano at the Conservatory of Music in Freiburg, West Germany from 1966 to 1968 and moved to Canada in 1975. She received a Bachelor of Music from the University of British Columbia in 1972 and a Master of Arts from Simon Fraser University in 1988. She taught acoustic communication at Simon Fraser University from 1982 to 1991.

Biography

In 1972, she married the Canadian poet and playwright Norbert Ruebsaat and has collaborated with him on a number of projects.

Music 

Many of her compositions deal with the acoustic environment and she often incorporates the medium of tape in conjunction with live instruments or voices, combining, manipulating and processing environmental sounds. Because her work focuses on nature, humanity, childhood and motherhood, it is more based in sound and not what would usually be considered as "music". She has been influenced by studying the works of composers like Pauline Oliveros, John Cage and Barry Truax.

Collaborations

She collaborated with director Gus Van Sant, with whom she seemed to share work that explored similar concepts. To quote Randolph Jordan, "Her compositions are ideally suited for helping to flesh out Van Sant's portraits of young people adrift in worlds from which they are seemingly detached, but who might well be pointing towards alternative modes of environmental awareness."

1973–91 

From 1973–80 Westerkamp worked as a research associate along with R. Murray Schafer at the World Soundscape Project at Simon Fraser University. This work fed into Schafer's book The Tuning of the World. In 1974 she began working as a producer and host at CFRO (Vancouver Cooperative Radio). Through her work with Schafer and with radio, she developed a deep interest and concern for noise and the acoustic environment, which greatly influenced her style of composition. After this time, she began to experiment with recording, processing, and mixing environmental sounds in the recording studio.

Westerkamp was involved in several other research projects on noise, acoustic ecology and music. From 1974 to 1975, she was a researcher with the Noise Abatement Project of the Society Promoting Environmental Conservation in Vancouver. 

Throughout the 1980s, she developed an interest in music for live performance, and in creating installations and other "composed environments" (sometimes in collaboration) for specific sites. In 1982, she was a researcher for the Women in Music project at Simon Fraser University. She is also a founding member of the World Forum on Acoustic Ecology (WFAE).

1991 - present 

After 1991, Westerkamp devoted herself to more fully to composing, lecturing, and writing, disseminating her compositions and ideas at concerts and conferences. She was editor of The Soundscape Newsletter from 1991 - 1995 and joined the editorial committee of Soundscape: The Journal of Acoustic Ecology, for the World Forum for Acoustic Ecology in 2000.

She has also composed soundtracks for radio dramas and film and her music has been featured in movies by Gus Van Sant including Elephant (2003) and Last Days (2005). She collaborated with Jesse Zubot on the electronic score for Koneline (2016).

Some of Westerkamp's works are directly related to feminism. In 1990, she composed "École Polytechnique", which was commissioned by Montréal Musiques Actuelles/New Music America. According to Andra McCartney and Marta McCarthy,"Hildegard Westerkamp's (1990) composition École Polytechnique is an artistic response to one of Canada's most profoundly disturbing mass murders, the 1989 slaying of fourteen women in Montreal, Quebec."

Discography

Recordings featuring Westerkamp's compositions, chronologically:

 (1989) Kits Beach Soundwalk
 (1990) Anthology of Canadian Music:Electroacoustic music
 (1990) The Aerial 2
 (1990) Électro clips (empreintes DIGITALes, IMED 9004, rereleased 1996 as IMED 9604)
 (1994) Radio Rethink - art and sound transmission
 (1995) Der Verlust der Stille
 (1995) Klang Wege
 (1995) Transmissions From Broadcast Artists, Radius #4
 (1996) The Vancouver Soundscape
 (1996) Transformations (empreintes DIGITALes, IMED 9631)
 (1997) 1977-1997, 20 Jahre Osnabrücker Komponisten
 (1998) Harangue I (Earsay, ES 98001)
 (1998) Harangue II (Earsay, ES 98005)
 (1999) The Dreams of Gaia
 (2000) Radiant Dissonance
 (2002) Into India (Earsay, ES 02002)
 (2003) Musique inpirée et tirée du film Elephant
 (2003) S:on

List of works

Compositions
Whisper Study (1975–79)
Familie mit Pfiff (Theme and Variations) (1976)
Fantasie for Horns I (1978)
Fantasie for Horns II (1979)
A Walk Through the City (1981)
Attending to Sacred Matters (2002)
Cool Drool (1983)
His Master's Voice (1985)
Harbour Symphony (1986)
Cricket Voice (1987)
Moments of Laughter (1988)
Kits Beach Soundwalk (1989)
 The Deep Blue Sea (1989)
Breathing Room (1990)
École polytechnique (1990)
Beneath the Forest Floor (1992)
India Sound Journal (1993)
Sensitive Chaos" (1995)
Dhvani (1996)
Talking Rain (1997)
Gently Penetrating beneath the sounding surfaces of another place (1997)
Into the Labyrinth (2000)
Attending to Sacred Matters (2002)
Like a Memory (2002)
Breaking News (2002)
Für Dich-For You (2005)

Composed environments and sound installations
Cordillera (Music from the New Wilderness Festival, Western Front Gallery, Vancouver, Feb 1980)
Zone of Silence Story, with Norbert Ruebsaat (Zone of Silence Project, Museum of Quebec, Quebec City, Dec 1985–Jan 1986
Coon Bay (1988)
Türen der Wahrnehmung (Ars Electronica '89, Linz, Austria, Sept 1989)
Nada - An Experience in Sound, in collaboration with Savinder Anand, Mona Madan, and Veena Sharma (Mati Ghar, Indira Gandhi National Centre for the Arts Janpath, New Delhi, India, 10–25 Dec, 1998)
At the Edge of Wilderness, in collaboration with photographer Florence Debeugny (Industrial Ear, Vancouver, Sept 8-16, 2000; Whyte Museum, Banff, 11 Oct, 2002 – 19 Jan, 2003; Victoria College of the Arts, Melbourne, 19–27 March 2003)
Soniferous Garden, rev. of Part 4 of Nada (Engine 27, New York, 7–15 Nov, 2000; Sound Practice [first UKISC Conference on Sound Culture and Environments], Dartington College of Arts, UK, Feb 2001; CCNOA, Brussels, 2–9 Feb, 2003; x-tract Sculpture Musicale, Podewil, Berlin, 1–12 Apr, 2003)

See also

 Music of Canada
 List of Canadian composers

References

Notes

Further reading
Chatelin, R. (1988). Hildegard Westerkamp: Wake-up and hear the crickets. Music Scene, 360, 7.
Jordan, R. (2007). The work of Hildegard Westerkamp in the films of Gus Van Sant. Offscreen, 11(8-9). Retrieved from: http://offscreen.com/view/jordan_westerkamp
Khazam, R. (2000). Soundscapes Be)for(e 2000—Amsterdam, Holland, 19–26 November 1999. Leonardo, 33(4), 338–39. doi:10.1162/leon.2000.33.4.338.
 McCartney, A. "Hildegard Westerkamp's Moments of Laughter: Recording Childhood, Performing Motherhood, Refusing to Shut up and Laughing." Perspectives of New Music, Vol 38, N 1, 2000.
 McCartney, A. (1995) "Inventing Images: Constructing and Contesting Gender in Thinking about Electroacoustic Music." Leonardo Music Journal, Vol.5 (57-66).
 McCartney, A. (1999). Sounding Places with Hildegard Westerkamp. (Doctoral dissertation). Retrieved from ProQuest Dissertations & Theses. (NQ46305).
Labelle, B. (1999). The sound of music: Contemporary sound-art and the phenomenal world. Art Papers, 23(2), 36-39.
Steenhuisen, P. (2009). Hildegard Westerkamp. In Sonic Mosaics: Conversations with Composers. Edmonton: University of Alberta Press.
Werner, H. U. (1994). Hildegard Westerkamp: I am a composer, I recycle sound. Soundscape - Akustische Landschaften: Eine Klangoekologische Spurensuche
Woloshyn, A. Playing with the voice and blurring boundaries in Hildegard Westerkamp’s "MotherVoiceTalk".  eContact!", 14(4). Retrieved from: http://econtact.ca/14_4/woloshyn_westerkamp.html
Young, G. (1984). Composing with environmental sound. Musicworks, 26, 4-8.
Zapf, D. (1981). Inside the soundscape: the compositions of Hildegard Westerkamp. Musicworks'', 15, 5-8.

External links
 
Ear Room interview (Mark Peter Wright 6th July 2011)
"Composer showcase: Hildegard Westerkamp" Canadian Music Centre
"The signal of noise." Ideas: With Paul Kennedy. CBC Radio.
Paula Gordon Show

Living people
German composers
German classical composers
Canadian classical composers
Canadian sound artists
Women sound artists
20th-century classical composers
German women composers
German film score composers
Electroacoustic music composers
1946 births
Hochschule für Musik Freiburg alumni
Academic staff of Simon Fraser University
University of British Columbia alumni
Canadian women in electronic music
Women classical composers
20th-century German composers
20th-century Canadian composers
German emigrants to Canada
20th-century women composers
20th-century Canadian women musicians
20th-century German women musicians
Canadian women composers